Jackson Brazier (born 30 June 1993), who performs as JXN, is an Australian R&B and pop music singer-songwriter-guitarist and internet personality. He issued his debut six-track extended play, Never a Sad Adventure, in May 2020.

Career
JXN had a following on Instagram as Jacko Brazier, prior to signing with Warner Music Australasia. In November 2018 he released his debut single, "Solitude". He followed with three singles in 2019, "Red Lights" featuring A Boogie Wit Da Hoodie, in April; "Going Off" featuring ASAP Twelvyy, in June; and "Just Okay" in October.

He released his debut extended play, Never a Sad Adventure, in May 2020. Thomas Bleach felt, "his smooth RNB stylings injected with a fresh breeze of alt-pop... resonated with listeners and created an insane hype." Acid Stags Chris Salcie observed, "the organic and electronic instrumentation utilised blend with absolute ease across the six track offering."

Touring
Jackson supported Allday on the latter's Starry Night Over the Phone 2019 nationwide tour.

Discography

Extended plays

Singles

Basketball career
Brazier is also a semi-professional basketball player, having played in the South East Australian Basketball League (SEABL) for the Kilsyth Cobras between 2014 and 2016. He re-joined the Cobras in 2021 after a four-year hiatus to play in the NBL1 South. He is listed as a 195 cm guard.

References 

21st-century Australian musicians
Living people
Musicians from Melbourne
1993 births